Maasdonk is a former municipality in the southern Netherlands that existed from 1993 until January 1, 2015, when it was merged into the existing municipalities of 's-Hertogenbosch and Oss.

Population centres 
Geffen
Nuland

References

External links
 
 

Municipalities of the Netherlands established in 1993
Municipalities of the Netherlands disestablished in 2015
Former municipalities of North Brabant
's-Hertogenbosch
Oss